No Stranger to Shame is the second studio album by American recording artist Uncle Kracker. It was released on August 27, 2002 via Lava Records. The album peaked at number 43 on the Billboard 200, spawning two charted singles "In a Little While" and "Drift Away" (featuring original singer Dobie Gray), the latter reaching #9 on the Billboard Hot 100 in the United States. It was certified gold by the Recording Industry Association of America on July 29, 2003.

Music
The music of No Stranger to Shame, like its predecessor, features an eclectic sound broadly categorized as rock by AllMusic, and as southern rock by Entertainment Weekly. The album also incorporates elements of hip hop and country. It is his last album to receive a parental advisory label and his last to feature rapping, on the songs "Keep It Comin'" and "No Stranger to Shame".

Track listing

Personnel

 Matthew Shafer – lead vocals, co-producer
 Jimmie "Bones" Trombly – background vocals (tracks 2, 10), organ & piano (tracks: 1, 8), drums (track 9)
 Michael Bradford – background vocals (tracks: 4, 10), additional vocals (tracks: 5, 12), keyboards (tracks: 1-9, 11-12), guitar (tracks: 1-11, 12), bass guitar (tracks: 1-9, 12), drums (tracks: 2-4, 8), mixing, producer
 Dobie Gray – vocals (track 5)
 Beth Hart – background vocals (track 7)
 Mark McGrath – additional vocals (track 12)
 Richard Baker – piano (track 5)
 Dean Parks – guitar (tracks: 5, 10)
 Philip Sayce – guitar (track 6)
 Wanda Vick – dobro, fiddle and mandolin (track 10)
 Jimmy Johnson – bass guitar (track 10)
 Larry Paxton – upright bass (track 11)
 Russ Kunkel – drums (tracks: 5, 10)
 Scott Krauss – drums (track 6)
 Jeffrey Fowlkes – drums (tracks: 7, 8)
 Dan Higgins – saxophone (track 7)
 Bill Reichenbach Jr. – saxophone (track 7)
 Jerry Hey – trumpet (track 7)
 Robert James Ritchie – executive producer
 Andy VanDette – mastering
 F. Scott Shafer – photography

Charts

Year-end charts

Certifications

References

External links

2002 albums
Lava Records albums
Uncle Kracker albums
Southern rock albums
Albums produced by Michael Bradford